Mark Morris High School is a public high school in Longview, Washington, for grades nine through twelve. In 2013, it had an enrollment of 976 students.

A part of Longview Public Schools, the school was built in 1957 and is named for Samuel Mark Morris, the third president of the Long-Bell Lumber Company. The school has a partially open campus. Students are allowed to leave campus during lunch if they wish.

Mark Morris was recognized as one of thirteen high schools identified as a high performing school in the area of math growth during the 2013 Washington Achievement Awards at OSPI in Olympia. OSPI assesses data from state testing over the past three years and it made significant growth during that period.

Athletics

The Mark Morris Monarchs compete in a wide variety of sports, including American football, basketball, girls' volleyball, soccer, cross country, water polo, wrestling, swimming, baseball, golf, bowling, softball, tennis, cheerleading and track and field. Local rivals include the R.A. Long High School Lumberjacks and the Kelso Hilanders. Mark Morris plays its home football games at Longview Memorial Stadium, which is near the R.A. Long campus.

Mark Morris plays rival R.A. Long at least once a year in football in a game called the "Civil War".

The Mark Morris gymnasium is named for Ted M. Natt, former editor of the Longview paper, The Daily News.

The school has a swimming pool on campus, The Dick Mealy Memorial Pool, which other district schools and the community at large can use. The Killer Whales Swim Club for area youth and adults meets at the pool.

State championships
 Baseball: 1973
 Boys basketball: 1978, 1985, 1987
 Boys golf: 1998
 Boys tennis: 1989
 Girls basketball: 2013, 2015
 Girls bowling: 2010, 2011, 2013, 2018, 2019
 Girls golf: 1994
 Girls tennis: 1979, 1980
 Volleyball: 1979, 1980

Notable alumni
Bud Black – former Major League Baseball pitcher and current Colorado Rockies manager
Doug Christie – former basketball player, retiring with the Los Angeles Clippers
Trevor Smith – state champion wrestler; NJCAA All-American wrestler; professional mixed martial artist currently competing in the UFC's Middleweight Division
Rick Sweet – former Major League Baseball catcher and current manager of the Colorado Springs Sky Sox.
Brian Thompson – actor, known for his work in action films and television series. Class of 77.
Lisa Sari – soccer midfielder who last played for the Los Angeles Sol of Women's Professional Soccer. She also coaches FC Portland. Her jersey still hangs in the main hallway at Mark Morris.

References

External links
Official website

High schools in Cowlitz County, Washington
Longview, Washington
Public high schools in Washington (state)
Educational institutions established in 1957
1957 establishments in Washington (state)